David Hodges is a fictional character portrayed by Wallace Langham on the CBS crime drama CSI: Crime Scene Investigation and its sequel, CSI: Vegas. Hodges is known for having a habit of giving far more information than anyone wants to hear while explaining things and is very afraid of germs.

Background 
Hodges, a lab technician with a B.A. from Williams College, was transferred to the Las Vegas crime lab from the Los Angeles crime lab, where his superiors felt he had an attitude problem. In Las Vegas, Hodges has annoyed his co-workers and superiors, and in the season 3 episode, "Play With Fire", he is one of the employees initially suspected of causing an explosion in the lab where co-worker Greg Sanders was working and, as a result, injured. Despite being accused of causing the explosion by Catherine Willows and Warrick Brown, he vehemently denies responsibility to the point of promising to call his lawyer if taken to case on the incident. He is ultimately cleared when it's discovered that Catherine caused the explosion. In the April 9, 2007, edition of TV Guide, Langham described his character as a "pain in the ass" who "kisses up" to his superiors. Langham said Hodges considers himself superior to the other laboratory technicians and wants to be like Gil Grissom. While Grissom was on a sabbatical during the seventh season, Hodges used an alias to sign up for an online class that Grissom was teaching. Grissom, however, appears to find Hodges annoying and often tells Hodges to report his findings to other CSIs or asks him to leave his office. Yet Hodges seems to be under the impression that he's held in much higher regard by the senior CSIs than he truly is and doesn't note his own character flaws (He once told co-worker Wendy "no one likes a kiss-ass", truly oblivious to how he acts the same way). In "I Like to Watch", Hodges contacts the reality television crew that is following the CSI crew while they investigate a case so they can video tape when he gives his report to Sara. While doing this, he uses as many complicated terms as possible, and Sara asks if he is all right. Also, at one point during the episode, he sees them filming the DNA lab and says that they should be in his trace lab because DNA is so overrated. These traits become less apparent during season 9, though they are still used for comic relief and he is more often portrayed as someone with poor social skills than a genuinely annoying character.

Despite his attitude, Hodges sometimes redeems himself. In the fifth season finale, "Grave Danger", he saves the entire CSI team when he calls them seconds before they are about to open the container that has trapped Nick Stokes and notifies them that Semtex charges are rigged at the bottom.

In the seventh season episode "Lab Rats", Hodges persuaded his fellow laboratory technicians to surreptitiously work with him in an attempt to identify The Miniature Killer. Hodges concluded at the end of the episode that bleach might be a common factor linking all four murder scenes. Grissom found Hodges in his office inspecting one of the miniatures and, after Hodges explained his conclusions, praised Hodges for his work. Then, returning to form, Grissom again asked Hodges to leave his office.

During this covert investigation, a phone number, linking the four Miniature Killer victims and previous suspect Ernie Dell, was dialed using Hodges's phone (reaching an answering service); Hodges is then concerned that the actual Miniature Killer has his phone number.

At the beginning of the eighth season, David Hodges becomes a main cast member. In the episode "The Case of the Cross-Dressing Carp", he tells Grissom he misses working with him on The Miniature Killer cases; Grissom says he misses it, too.

Hodges is also known for having an unusually acute sense of smell, and is able to identify many chemical compounds by their odor alone. In one case, he was asked to verify if a person's stomach contents had traces of cyanide, which has a smell not unlike bitter almonds, but which requires a specific scent-related gene to be able to discern, which Hodges possesses.

Due to a shortage of CSIs at the beginning of season 9 due to Warrick's death, Hodges has been rotated onto the field at least twice—three times overall, counting an appearance on the field in season 8. He is known for his disdain of working on the field. Despite this, he almost lazily discovered crucial evidence in a matter of seconds during one outing.

In "One to Go", Hodges becomes especially upset upon hearing of Grissom's departure, telling him, "The bad guys will win more if we don't have you," and asking, "Who was Watson without Sherlock Holmes?" This prompts Grissom to respond, "Watson was a genius in his own right." Perhaps because of this, he is unfriendly toward his would-be new colleague, Raymond Langston, even going so far as to waste Langston's time while making him wait to get trace evidence processed. However, later on in the episode "The Grave Shift", he does state to Langston that he's impressed after Langston demonstrates the construction and detonation of a cornmeal time-bomb made to kill a victim.

At the end of "The Grave Shift", he strides into Grissom's old office—now shared by Nick Stokes, Greg Sanders, and Riley Adams—and places Grissom's infamous fetal pig in a jar on one of the shelves, stating that it "belongs here". He then leaves without a word.

CSI: Vegas reveals that he still worked in the lab when Joshua Fulsom and Allie Rajan were starting out, and told the former about Grissom and Sara. Since then, he has left the lab and become an expert witness. In "Legacy", the person who mandated the attack on Jim Brass also rented a storage unit in Hodges's name, which they equipped like a miniature crime lab, leading to Hodges getting accused of faking evidence.

Personal life 
Hodges is apparently an avid fan of the 1970s TV sitcom Three's Company, winning an online auction for a fictional Three's Company board game in the episode "Lab Rats". He is also apparently an aficionado of country-soul singer Willis; in the seventh-season episode "Post Mortem" Hodges is seen dancing in the laboratory to a down-tempo cover of the song "Word Up!" while waiting for the results of a test.

In a season 5 episode, "Iced", Hodges is revealed to have a "genetic quirk" that allows someone to be able to smell if cyanide is present, and Doc Robbins uses this unique ability to test if two victims died of cyanide poisoning. While many people do have the ability to smell cyanide, Hodges's ability is more acute than most and appears to extend to other chemical compounds besides cyanide. This talent of his has been used on other cases like that of the dead elderly couple in "The Theory of Everything", to determine if cyanide had anything to do with their death.

Hodges is a go-kart enthusiast. Jujubes are his gummy candy of choice. Pistachios are his favorite nut because they are "easy to open".

Hodges has a cat named Kobayashi Maru, an apparent reference to the no-win training scenario administered to Star Fleet Academy students, as seen in Star Trek II: The Wrath of Khan and the eleventh Star Trek film. He calls the cat "Mr. K" or "Kobe" in the seventh-season episode "Monster in the Box".

In the episode "Wild Life" from season 11, Hodges confesses to Sara he is ornithophobic (afraid of birds).

In season 12 episode 4 "Maid Man" he confesses to Catherine that twice he failed to pass the driving test and received a license only the third time.

Relationships 

In past seasons, the character has had an interest in Sara, but she has never given him any reason to believe she shares his feelings. Langham said Hodges has a crush on fellow lab tech Wendy Simms. We see continuous flirting between them in every scene that they share. In the eighth-season episode "The Chick Chop Flick Shop", Hodges and the other lab techs, Ronnie and Sara are seen watching a low-budget slasher film in which Wendy played a victim. Ronnie criticizes the genre for featuring stereotypically large-breasted women and Wendy argues that her breasts are not large, but are rather "kind of medium". Hodges, evidently not realizing that he's speaking aloud, adds "but perfect", to which everyone turns around and stares at him. He then attempts to cover his tracks, tacking "-ly adequate" on to the end of his sentence. In the season 8 episode 'You Kill Me", he labeled "Mindy Bimms", a player piece in his CSI board game, representing Wendy Simms as "clumsy yet buxom" (thus causing Wendy to get upset with him when she read it).

In the season 9 episode  "A Space Oddity" after bumping into each other at an Astro Quest convention, there is considerable romantic tension, with Hodges repeatedly having fantasies regarding the show with him and Wendy in the main roles. These interfere with his work, something he blames Wendy for. This leads them to argue and bring their feelings out into the open. Wendy finally exclaims "It's good you're having fantasies because it means you're not as oblivious as everyone around here seems to think!". This shows that she has feelings for him. However, Hodges's guilt about his feelings for her interfering with his work prevents him from doing anything about it. He attempts to keep their relationship professional, though the romantic tension remains. In Hog Heaven, he rebukes a suspect who insults Wendy in front of him, demanding that the suspect apologize to her. In return, the suspect headbutts him in the face, causing his nose to bleed, and causing Wendy to chide him. Wendy kisses him at the end of "Field Mice".

At age seventeen, Hodges tried to pick up a prostitute who turned out to be an undercover police officer. Because he was underage, the arrest didn't go on his permanent record ("...because you're three months shy of your eighteenth birthday, so when you phone your Mom to come and get you, it doesn't go on my permanent record.") (Ending Happy)

In Pool Shark, Wendy leaves, not telling him until last minute, leaving him hurt and upset to the point where he hits and starts to drown Henry when he tells him what he did wrong and later mopes around CSI. However, Greg Sanders arranges "man dates" in which he meets up with David every week to take his mind off Wendy. Sanders and Hodges are usually seen as rivals during the earlier seasons, leading to something of a love-hate relationship: the two would often argue, but in Grave Danger they were seen playing a board game together and in Appendicitement, the two, along with Nick, "kidnapped" lab tech Henry Andrews to take him out for his birthday.

Although Morgan Brody has previously pretended to be dating Hodges to get his mother off his back (resulting in a putative romance between his mother and her father), Hodges states in "Homecoming" that they could not date for real. While insisting she has no interest in any case, Morgan queries this, but all Hodges will say is that his recent trip to Italy (with his mother) was "life-changing". The audience, like Morgan, is left to draw its own conclusions.

When Ecklie is shot and put in the hospital to recover, Hodges is there for Morgan as support. Morgan begins to break down, blaming herself for her father's current state. When he attempts to calm her down, she suddenly kisses him. He's shocked, and both agree to pretend that it didn't happen. Morgan says that he is her best friend.

In more recent episodes, Hodges meets gorgeous Elisabetta from Italy while on vacation.  The two become engaged, but wind up breaking off their engagement after his fiancée insists that once they marry, they'll move back to Italy to work on a relative's vineyard.  Hodges tells his fiancée he's a scientist and can never do that.  The two part ways amicably.

It is revealed in CSI: Vegas that he is married to a woman named Emma, who " mellows [him] out", and that they were expecting. Their son, Cooper, was born in the season finale.

See also 
List of CSI: Crime Scene Investigation characters

References 

CSI: Crime Scene Investigation characters
CSI: Vegas
Fictional forensic scientists
Fictional Las Vegas Police Department detectives
Television characters introduced in 2003